Central Switzerland is the region of the Alpine Foothills geographically the heart and historically the origin of Switzerland, with the cantons of Uri, Schwyz, Obwalden, Nidwalden, Lucerne and Zug.

Central Switzerland is one of the NUTS 2 Statistical Regions. As such it includes the cantons of Lucerne, Uri, Schwyz, Obwalden, Nidwalden, Zug.

See also
Cantons of Switzerland
Waldstätte

References

Regions of Switzerland
NUTS 2 statistical regions of the European Union